Don Bosco College of Engineering is an institute of technical education in Fatorda, Goa. It was established in 2011, and is run by the Fatorda Salesian Society. The college campus was designed by civil engineer Olavo Carvalho.

HISTORY
Introduction of its genesis including its registration status
The Fatorda Salesian Society is a registered Society in the State of Goa. We are part of the World wide society of DON BOSCO with our branches in over 100 countries in the world. Our head office is situated in Rome. In India we have over five hundred institutes engaged in the education of the Young. Our Regional office is set up at Odxel, near Goa University campus. Our Focus is in the Education of the Young. The Institution has been established and is administered by the Salesians of Don Bosco and it is open to all the Youth, irrespective of caste or creed.
Details of its Promoters including their background
In 1971, on account of the complexity of works, the Technical Section of Panjim was shifted to Fatorda. This shift also marked the Silver Jubilee of the arrival of the Salesian in Goa. Fr. Henry Torra, a Spaniard, was entrusted with the supervision of the construction of buildings and starting of the project. The purpose of the Don Bosco Technical School was to train the boys who were unable to complete their education. The Institute commenced its activities on July 16, 1973, offering non formal training in the trades of the Fitter, Machinist, Welder, Electrician and Motor Mechanic. It received a very encouraging response and the needs kept growing, such that in August 1983, the National Council for Vocational Training (NCVT), Government of India recognized it as an Industrial Training Institute (ITI).

Affiliations
The college is affiliated with Goa University and approved by the AICTE.

Courses offered
 B.E. Civil Engineering: The civil engineering department undergraduates undertook a flood management solution project in 2018.
 B.E. Computer Engineering
 B.E. Electronics & Telecommunication Engineering
 B.E. Electronics and Computer Science
 B.E. Mechanical engineering: The mechanical engineering department had conducted a programme on industrial automation in the year 2018. Undergraduates of the department also undertook a project related to mechanical beach cleaning. In 2018, the department increased the intake for their B.E. course by an additional 60 seats.

Sports
The college has several sports facilities and takes part in football, cricket, chess, cycling and other sports.

FiiRE
Don Bosco college has a Business Incubation Center called Forum for Innovation, Incubation Research and Entrepreneurship (FiiRE). This center has a partnership with the state agriculture department, and has even signed a Memorandum of Understanding with Manovikas School's Manovikas Public Charitable Trust to guide students from a young age.

Cultural and non-academic activities
DBCE organizes a project exposition called Kshitij. The Civil Engineering department organizes a national-level technical festival called Sankriti. The ETC department organizes inter college competition called technova. The college also has an active students' chapter of the Goa Technology Association (GTA).

Gallery

See also
 Goa Engineering College
 Don Bosco Institute of Technology, Bangalore
 Don Bosco Institute of Technology, Mumbai

References

External links
 

Engineering colleges in Goa
Educational institutions established in 2011
Education in South Goa district
2011 establishments in Goa